Alejandra Ramírez Caballero (born 2 March 1997) is a Mexican sports shooter. She competed in the women's trap event at the 2020 Summer Olympics. She won the bronze medal at 2019 Pan Am Games and became the first ever Mexican female trap shooter who earned a spot at the Olympics. She also won the gold medal at the 2018 Central American and Caribbean Games.

References

External links
 

1997 births
Living people
Mexican female sport shooters
Olympic shooters of Mexico
Shooters at the 2020 Summer Olympics
Sportspeople from Guadalajara, Jalisco
Pan American Games medalists in shooting
Medalists at the 2019 Pan American Games
Pan American Games bronze medalists for Mexico
21st-century Mexican women